American Red Cross Motor Corps (also known as American Red Cross motor service) was founded in 1917 by the American Red Cross (ARC). The service was composed of women and it was developed to render supplementary aid to the U.S. Army and Navy in transporting troops and supplies during World War I, and to assist other ARC workers in conducting their various relief activities. The diverse character of the work included canteen work, military hospitals, camps and cantonments, home service workers, outside aid, office detail, other ARC activities, and miscellaneous services, such as the 1918 flu pandemic.

Establishment
As a result of a conference held in Washington D.C. at the call of the director of the Bureau of Motor Corps Service, the motor service in six of the principal cities of the country which previously had been independent in its organization, was amalgamated with the Red Cross corps. This made the Red Cross Motor Corps Service a thoroughly coordinated institution, able to meet the local and inter-local demands for transportation throughout the US on a nationalized basis. The organizations which became parts of the Red Cross Motor Corps Service were the Motor Messenger Service of Philadelphia; the National Service League Motor Corps, of Atlanta; the National Service League Motor Corps, of New York City and Buffalo; the Emergency Motor Corps, of New Orleans, and the Emergency Drivers, of Chicago. All these organizations were represented at a national conference by their commanding officers, who then become commanders of the Red Cross Motor Corps Service in their respective cities. The four independent services added more than six hundred members to the Motor Corps ranks.

In the comparatively few months during which the national bureau became controlled of the volunteer motor corps of the various cities, important progress was made in efficiency and uniformity of service. Rules and requirements were standardized. Physical fitness, driving expertness, mechanical knowledge, independence in case of road accident, and military drill became requirements for members of the transportation division. For ambulance drivers, the additional requirements were first aid and stretcher drill. For auxiliary aides, who were non-driving members, 12 days' experience in the accident ward of a hospital was necessary.

In conformity with the request of the US War Department, the uniform of khaki and the insignia formerly employed have been discarded. The new regulation uniform of the Motor Corps became Red Cross Oxford grey. The cars of the service are to be distinguished by a white metal pennant, bearing the red cross and the words "Motor Corps" This and the driver's identification card were considered sufficient to give the cars the right of way when on official business. It has been decided that women of the ARC Motor Corps Service would carry the official telegrams containing information regarding over-seas casualties to the homes of relatives killed and wounded.

World War I

The Motor Corps of the Red Cross was organized during World War I primarily to render supplementary aid to the Army and Navy, particularly in removing sick and wounded men from ships and trains to hospitals and homes. It was also to cooperate with other Red Cross Departments and Bureaus in calling for and delivering supplies; to carry canteen workers, with their supplies and equipment to points where troops in transit were to be provided with meals; to take Red Cross nurses, and Civilian Relief and Home Service workers on official errands; and to furnish transportation, without cost, for Red Cross activities generally, for local charities and hospitals and dispensaries, and for Liberty Loan Drives, Public Health work, and other government activities. There was little glamour to attract worker's to this service, for it was frequently very arduous, carried out under all kinds of conditions, in all weather, and at any time when there was need. In spite of this, the response to the first call for volunteers was generous. The service was organized as a Bureau of the Department of Military Relief, and in every Chapter which organized a Motor Corps, a Captain was appointed to command the Corps, with power to appoint Lieutenants and noncommissioned officers. Military discipline and an appropriate measure of military training were strictly enforced. The First Division consisted of the ambulance drivers and truck drivers, who were required to meet the highest standard, and to perform the most exacting and the heaviest service, of the Corps. The First Division women had to pass searching examinations in motor mechanics, first aid, sanitary troop and stretcher drill, and road driving. A certificate was given to every woman who qualified for the First Division.

By June 30, 1918, there were already in operation throughout the US approximately 100 Motor Corps with a membership of about 3,000 women. During the summer of 1918, the development of the Motor Corps was rapid and systematic. On November 1, 1918, there were over 12,000 motor corps workers, most of whom were donating not only their time, but also the use of their cars. Many new Corps were formed throughout the country, and various motor organizations which had up until then been operating independently came in under the Red Cross, until by December 31, 1918, there were 297 Motor Corps in the United States with a membership of 11,604, exclusive of the Auxiliaries and the Reserves who had placed their names on the lists for service in times of emergency. In addition to the fact that all the members of the Motor Corps were volunteers, each member supplied her own car and sustained all its operating expenses. The members who gave regular Motor Corps service were expected to be on duty a minimum of 16 hours a week, although they did not limit themselves to that total, the general average being more than twice the required minimum. During the twenty months ending February 28, 1919, a mileage of more than 3,572,000 miles was covered by the automobiles operated by the motor corps with services provided to canteens, military hospitals, camps, cantonments, home service workers, outside aid, office detail, and other ARC activities, as well as during the 1918 flu pandemic. The Red Cross Motor Service was composed of women volunteers who used their personal cars.

How faithful the Motor Corps was in maintaining its interest and activity to the very end of the war was evident from the figures for the months of March, April, May and June 1919, in which 249,568 service hours, and 759,071 service miles, were operated. Over 3,370 workers, of whom 3,240 were actively in the field, were engaged in the work, employing 2,603 passenger cars, 71 ambulances, 44 trucks and 146 other vehicles. Out of 190 active Corps, only 83, or less than half, reported statistics for this compilation, and the real total of services done was actually far greater. Except for incidental service which was rendered in connection with entertainment and recreation under Red Cross auspices at the remaining military hospitals, and for the active Home Service and Nursing Service work in the civilian field, in time of disaster or epidemic, by December 1920, the Motor Corps was mostly demobilized, retaining primarily a reserve organization to meet peacetime emergencies of civilian as well as military character.

Ambulance Service
As the war drew on toward its close, the Ambulance Service of the Motor Corps in the US became increasingly important and useful, and after the Armistice, during the winter of 1918 and spring of 1919, there were several hundred Red Cross ambulances in use in various parts of the country, supplementing the work of the Army and Navy in transporting sick and wounded men from ships and trains to their destinations. and aiding hospitals and local relief organizations. On December 31, 1918, the reports of the Motor Corps from the Divisions disclosed for the last year of the war that the Motor Corps gave an average minimum service amounting to 6,864,000 service hours, which, figured in their value in dollars, representing a tremendous donation to the Red Cross war fund. Approximately 34,— 320,000 service miles were operated during the year. The value of the motor equipment alone, put at the service of the Red Cross free of charge, represented an investment of over $17,000,000, exclusive of upkeep and operating maintenance. In the late winter and early spring of 1919, an additional need for Motor Service developed in connection with the entertainments and recreations under the auspices of the Red Cross at the various hospitals. The demand was particularly heavy during the spring and summer months, for many of the parties and entertainments then given were out of doors and sometimes at a considerable distance from the hospital.

1918 flu pandemic

During the influenza epidemic which spread over the country in the autumn of 1918, the Red Cross Motor Service met and passed, in a distinguished way, its severest test. There are on file at ARC National Headquarters hundreds of newspaper clippings and testimonial letters of appreciation from military, naval and medical men and authorities, and from public institutions and private individuals, testifying to the valiant work of the Corps in the influenza crisis. Fearless of the possibility of contracting influenza themselves, the Motor Corps women worked night and day, serving frequently as much as 100 hours per week apiece, carrying patients—on their backs, in sheets, in blankets, on chairs, or whatever was available when stretchers could not be used— to hospitals from homes of poverty and luxury alike. No assignment was refused, nor did members of the Motor Corps confine themselves to these services-—they did anything that needed doing. It is on record that they actually scrubbed floors and cooked meals for families, all members of which were ill, and in several instances they even conducted funerals.

Perth Amboy disaster
In the 1918 T. A. Gillespie Company Shell Loading Plant explosion, when the Gillespie Munitions Loading Plant was destroyed, the Corps rendered invaluable service in transporting doctors, nurses and relief workers to the scene of the explosion, and in picking up hundreds of refugees and finding shelter, food, clothing and medical attention for them.

World War II

Many of the corp members took classes in auto maintenance to keep their cars running and used their own transportation to deliver supplies, and transport not only the sick and wounded, but also volunteers to and from facilities. The mechanics classes included information on everything from jumping the ignition to changing tires and also included 20 hours of emergency medical training. Several large cities, like New York City and Chicago had African American units of the Motor Corps.

In Hawaii, volunteers attended first aid courses at Queen's Hospital and studied to become members of the Red Cross Women's Volunteer Motor Corps. Their studies were difficult. They learned to drive and maintain heavy army trucks, trailer rigs, and ambulances; change massive tires and fix engines; and “first aid, emergency delivery of babies, blackout driving, military drills, and defense against gas attacks.” On July 20, 1941, Ginger Lilly, along with her other Red Cross Motor Corps drivers, “began regular duties” and were “given a complete list of assignments for ‘Attack Day.’” On December 7, 1941, Ginger reported for duty in her gray gabardine Red Cross uniform, tin helmet and gas mask. For three days from Pearl Harbor, she transported the wounded, “…many of whom were in great pain and shock and terribly worried about their wives and children,” to makeshift first aid stations set up in all the local schools, such as Farrington and Ma‘ema‘e Elementary in Nu‘uanu Valley. “They pressed upon me scraps of paper telling their names and which hospital they’d be in and begged me to find their wives and children. I said I would.”

References

Bibliography

External links

American Red Cross
1917 establishments in Washington, D.C.
Ambulance services of World War I
Ambulance services in the United States